Medial Tower (HaMigdal HaTikhon), is a high-rise commercial building in Tel Aviv, Israel. Construction began in 2001, and it was completed in 2004. It is 89.00 metre high. It was designed in the modernist architectural style.

References

Buildings and structures in Tel Aviv
Buildings and structures completed in 2004
Modernist architecture in Israel